These are the official results of the Men's Decathlon competition at the 1988 Summer Olympics in Seoul, South Korea. There were a total number of 39 participating athletes, with five competitors who didn't finish the competition.

Medalists

Schedule

September 28, 1988

September 29, 1988

Records
These were the standing world and Olympic records (in points) prior to the 1988 Summer Olympics.

(*) Original score according to the 1962/1977 tables.

(**) Score according to the 1985 tables.

Thompson's mark was not a world record in 1984, but when the 1985 tables came into use, his mark became the record. They were both given credit for the world record.

Results

See also
 1986 Men's European Championships Decathlon
 1987 Men's World Championship Decathlon
 1988 Hypo-Meeting
 1990 Men's European Championships Decathlon

References

External links
 Official Report
 Results

Decathlon
1988
Men's events at the 1988 Summer Olympics